Nélida Roca (May 30, 1929December 4, 1999), was one of the first showbusiness divas and sex symbols of Argentina. She was an actress, dancer, singer, model and theater supervedette.

Born Nélida Mercedes Musso in Buenos Aires, her friends and colleagues fondly called her La Roca ("The Rock"). From childhood, she sought to become a famous artist, but had to confront her parents' strong opposition to the idea. Her mother was from the Galicia region of Spain, and her father was an Italian man from Genoa.
 
Nélida married Julio Rivera Roca, a jazz piano player, in 1949, which got her to complete her dream as the lead vocalist in his orchestra. She was discovered in 1950, during one such performance, by Luis César Amadori, owner of the Maipó Theatre, and first starred on the professional stage in Amadori's The Maipó Theatre is Telling its Stories. The show's commercial success allowed Amadori to triple the price of the seats, and she became a legend in her genre during the 1950s. Critics and her public came to know her as "The Venus of Corrientes Avenue" (the Buenos Aires theatre district).

She remarried in 1963 with vocalist Aldo Perricone (known by his stage name, Ricky Giuliano), though the marriage ended in 1969. In her last show, in the winter of 1974, she shared top credits with the then up-and-coming star, Susana Giménez. The show, The Golden Revue, her last performance, dealt with cultural changes in Argentina over the years.

Death
She died of a heart attack in December 1999, at age 70.

References

Sources
 Clarín: Murió Nélida Roca, la reina de la revista porteña 
 La Nación: Nélida Roca, adiós a un mito porteño 
 Maipó Theatre: Nélida Roca 

1929 births
1999 deaths
Actresses from Buenos Aires
Argentine people of Italian descent
Argentine people of Spanish descent
Argentine people of Galician descent
Argentine stage actresses
Argentine female dancers
Argentine female models
Cabaret singers
Burlesque performers
Argentine vedettes
Argentine musical theatre actresses
Argentine musical theatre female dancers
Argentine musical theatre women singers
Burials at La Chacarita Cemetery
20th-century Argentine actresses
20th-century Argentine women singers
20th-century Argentine dancers
21st-century Argentine women